Filipov, female form Filipova, is a Bulgarian surname.

It is a commonly used surname in North Macedonia. A large Filipov family exists in Australia that immigrated there in the late 1960s.

Notable people
Notable people who have this surname include:
 Filip Filipov, Bulgarian football player
 Georgi Filipov, Bulgarian football player
 Grisha Filipov, Bulgarian politician
 Hyusein Filipov, Bulgarian football player
 Nadiya Filipova, Bulgarian rowing cox
 Pavlina Filipova, Bulgarian biathlete
 Strashimira Filipova, Bulgarian volleyball player
 Tsvetan Filipov, Bulgarian football player
 Venelin Filipov, Bulgarian football player

See also
 Filippov, the Russian equivalent

Bulgarian-language surnames
Patronymic surnames
Surnames from given names